List of Colonial Heads of the British Virgin Islands

Colonial heads of the British Virgin Islands
Colonial heads
British Virgin Islands